Maturba is a town in eastern Libya in the Derna District.

The Martuba Air Base is located in Maturba. During the Second World War the airfield at Maturba, saw heavy fighting in 1942.

Martuba is connected with Lamluda by two roads. The main road which goes through Derna is part of the Libyan Coastal Highway while The inner road passes through the desert.

Notes

Populated places in Derna District